Transgender rights in Canada, including procedures for changing legal gender and protections from discrimination, vary among provinces and territories, due to Canada's nature as a federal state. According to the 2021 Canadian census, 59,460 Canadians identify as transgender.

Government identity documents

There are two main routes to changing one's legal gender in Canada: the Immigration (or 'federal') route, and the Vital Statistics (or 'provincial/territorial' route). Of note is the distinction between 'legal gender' and 'gender marker'; a legal gender (also commonly referred to as a sex designation; sex indicator in Nova Scotia) is what appears on foundational identity documents such as immigration status documents and birth certificates, whilst a gender marker can appear on a non-foundational identity document, such as a driver's licence or photo card. A gender marker usually follows legal gender, but can differ - and a change in gender marker on a non-foundational identity document alone does not provide a trans individual with foundational identity documentation that establishes such a change.

Four provinces (Alberta, British Columbia, Ontario, and Saskatchewan) and all three territories (Northwest Territories, Nunavut, and Yukon) do not offer anyone not born there the ability to change their legal gender.

Table overview

Federal 
Canadian Permanent Residents, Citizens (born inside or outside Canada), Protected Persons, Refugee Claimants and Temporary Residents may apply to Immigration, Refugees and Citizenship Canada using form CIT 0404: Request for a Change of Sex or Gender Identifier. Amendment of documents issued by the person's country of birth, former habitual residence, or nationality is not required. Once the person's gender is changed with IRCC, the agency will issue a Verification of Status annotated with the person's change of name (if any) and gender, as a linking document between their Canadian identity and their foreign birth certificate. Since June 2019, the Canadian passport, citizenship certificate, permanent resident documentation and protected person documentation have offered an "X" option for legal gender.

In July 2020, Global News reported that the policy of not allowing refugee claimants and temporary residents to change their legal gender was causing harm, especially to asylum seekers. The article cites the case of Naomi Chen (a pseudonym), a trans woman who was born in Hong Kong and holds Chinese nationality and Hong Kong permanent resident status. Chen's HKSAR passport still states her gender as 'male', and consequently she was issued a Refugee Protection Claimant Document by IRCC bearing that gender.

Chen was not able to change her legal gender in Hong Kong, fearing that her marriage, which was solemnized in Hong Kong, would be terminated (Hong Kong does not allow same-sex marriage).  She says she is now afraid of interacting with the community, given the incorrect gender designation on her documents. In response, Kevin Lemkay, spokesperson for federal immigration minister Marco Mendicino, said that 'reviewing gender identity requirements for government-issued documents [was] a priority'. Will Tao, a Vancouver immigration lawyer, noted that the restriction was a matter of policy and not law. He contended that the Canadian federal government was potentially committing a violation of Section 15 of the Canadian Charter of Rights and Freedoms, in Tao's own words an issue "ripe for future litigation".

As of November 2020, refugee claimants are now able to amend the sex indicator printed on their Refugee Protection Claimant Document. As of March 2021, the same is also now available to temporary residents without the amendment of gender on their country of nationality's passport. Applicants may also elect to amend their legal gender through a provincial process instead, if this is available to them in their province or territory of residence.

Alberta
Following a 2014 court ruling that struck down the existing legislation and its surgery requirements as unconstitutional, the government of Alberta modified the Vital Statistics Information Regulation in 2015. The current regulations eliminate the surgical requirement. Instead, the applicant must submit a "statement confirming that the person identifies with and is maintaining the gender identity that corresponds with the requested amendment to the sex on the record of birth," as well as a letter from a physician or psychologist attesting that the amendment is appropriate. Legal change of gender is accessible to minors; this requires the parents' or guardians' consent, although this can be waived by court order or if the minor is emancipated, married, or a parent.

A legal change of gender through the province is not currently accessible to residents who were not born in Alberta.

British Columbia
In British Columbia, the requirement for surgery to change the birth certificate gender marker was removed in 2014. A legal change of gender is not accessible to residents who were not born in British Columbia. Non-binary B.C. resident Kori Doty, along with seven other trans and intersex persons, filed a human rights complaint against the province, alleging that publishing a sex indicator on birth certificates was discriminatory. The British Columbia Human Rights Tribunal agreed in 2015 to hear their complaint. In April 2017, Doty's child, Searyl Atli Doty, became the first in the world to be issued a health card with a "U" gender marker (for 'unspecified'), but the province has refused to issue a birth certificate without specifying a gender. Doty has filed a legal challenge. In 2022, British Columbia allowed people to change their gender designation on the province's main government-issued ID (BC Services Card, B.C. driver’s licence, BCID card and B.C. birth certificate) without the confirmation of a medical professional.

A legal change of gender through the province is not currently accessible to residents who were not born in British Columbia.

Manitoba
A change of legal gender in Manitoba is available to persons born there. As of the 1st February 2015, there exists no requirement for trans individuals to have undergone gender confirmation surgery. Section 25(3) of the Vital Statistics Act of Manitoba further provides that "a person may apply to the director for a change of sex designation certificate if the person is a Canadian citizen who has been a resident of Manitoba for at least one year before the date the application is submitted." This follows the model formerly adopted by Québec (now invalidated by the Superior Court in that province), but is discrepant with Manitoba's own policy for legal changes of name (three months' ordinary residence). As of July 2020, this provision has been implemented by the Manitoba Vital Statistics Agency.

As of October 13, 2020, the gender marker on Manitoba driver licenses and photo cards can either be unspecified or marked with an 'X'. This is in response to a complaint lodged at the Manitoba Human Rights Commission by non-binary individuals.

A legal change of gender through the province is not current accessible to residents who were not in Manitoba nor a Canadian citizen.

New Brunswick

In April 2017, a bill passed the Legislative Assembly of New Brunswick to add gender identity or expression to the human rights laws and to allow gender changes without the required surgery. A person born in New Brunswick or ordinarily resident there for at least three months may make application to Service New Brunswick for a change of their legal gender.

Newfoundland and Labrador
Persons born in Newfoundland and Labrador have been able to have the sex indicator on their birth registration changed since the adoption of a new Vital Statistics Act in 2009. Initially, that provision was available only to those who had undergone gender confirmation surgery, but such requirement was removed following the December 2015 decision of a Newfoundland and Labrador Human Rights Board of Inquiry on complaints filed with the Human Rights Commission from two trans women.  The amendment received Royal Assent on April 13, 2016.

The first gender-neutral birth certificate in Newfoundland and Labrador, and possibly the first in Canada, was issued December 14, 2017, to Gemma Hickey, a non-binary resident of St. John's, the province's capital. Hickey, an award-winning activist, had launched court action seeking to compel the Government of Newfoundland and Labrador to issue the gender-neutral certificate after their application for such a document was rejected because the application form was limited to male or female designation only.  Hickey withdrew the court action after the government agreed to amend the Vital Statistics Act to authorize the issuing of gender-neutral birth certificates.  That amendment received Royal Assent on December 7, 2017.

On June 1, 2021, a bill to amend the Vital Statistics Act to provide for the issuance of certificates of change of sex designation to people born outside Newfoundland and Labrador who have been living in the province for three months was tabled. On June 17, the bill passed Second Reading and the Committee of the Whole stage, and Third Reading on June 22. On June 23, Royal Assent was given. Therefore, Newfoundland and Labrador now permits a provincial change of legal gender for all residents, regardless of citizenship or immigration status, or birthplace.

Northwest Territories
The Northwest Territories government removed the surgery requirement for a legal gender change from the Vital Statistics Act in June 2016.

A territorial legal change of gender is not accessible to residents who were not born in NWT.

Nova Scotia 
On May 11, 2015, Bill 82, An Act to Amend Chapter 66 of the Revised Statutes, 1989, the Change of Name Act, and Chapter 494 of the Revised Statutes, 1989, the Vital Statistics Act received Royal Assent. This act abolishes the surgical requirement, instead requiring a statement "that the applicant has assumed, identifies with and intends to maintain the gender identity that corresponds with the change requested," and an attestation from a professional that the applicant's gender identity does not correspond to that listed on the birth certificate. The Act came into force the week of September 24, 2015.

Therefore, a change of sex indicator is now available in Nova Scotia for persons born there or those who have been ordinarily resident at least three months in the province. Nova Scotia also offers the option of no gender being displayed on one's driver's licence and/or identification card.

Nunavut
Nunavut removed the surgery requirement for a legal gender change from the Vital Statistics Act in March 2015.

A territorial legal change of gender is not accessible to residents who were not born in Nunavut.

Ontario
On 11 April 2012, the Human Rights Tribunal of Ontario ruled that gender confirmation surgery is no longer required for a change in registered gender on Ontario documents. In its decision, the Tribunal ordered that the Ontario government "shall cease requiring transgender persons to have 'transsexual surgery' in order to obtain a change in sex designation on their registration of birth" and has 180 days to "revise the criteria for changing sex designation on a birth registration". However, some medical certification is still required. It is also not accessible to residents who were not born in Ontario.

In July 2021, an Ontario resident who was born abroad tried to obtain photo identification from ServiceOntario, only to be rejected as she could not obtain an amended birth certificate from her country of birth, nor an Ontario birth certificate. The alternative mentioned in the article was medical certification with prohibitive requirements. (However, the federal government does offer another alternative without medical gatekeeping requirements, as described in the Federal section of this article).

Prince Edward Island 
In April 2016, the Prince Edward Island government amended the Vital Statistics Act to allow individuals to change their legal gender on ID without surgery. Individuals must present a letter from a doctor attesting to the applicant's gender identity. Islanders can also now choose to display no gender on their PEI-issued driver's licence/voluntary identification card.

A provincial change of legal gender remains inaccessible for PEI residents born off-Island.

Québec 

Since October 2015, adults have been able to change their legal gender on birth certificates in Québec. The process was simplified for minors in June 2016.

To qualify to change legal gender, the person concerned by the application must be domiciled in Québec for at least one year. If the person concerned by the application was born in Québec but lives elsewhere, the person may also qualify to change the sex designation if the person shows that such an amendment is not possible in the province or country in which the person is domiciled. They may make application to the Directeur de l'etat civil for a Certificate of Change of Mention of Sex (certificat de changement de la mention du sexe), regardless of their place of birth; however, this is solely limited to a male or female sex designation, forbidding the use of a non-binary gender designator. They may also apply for a combination Certificate of Change of Mention of Sex and Name (certificat de changement de la mention du sexe et de nom). After such a certificate is issued, one's gender may be amended on a Québec birth certificate. If one was born outside Québec, the birth certificate will be designated a semi-authentic act pursuant to Article 137 of the Civil Code.

Previously, Québec required applicants to be Canadian citizens. A 2021 court ruling, Centre for Gender Advocacy et al. v. Attorney General of Québec, has struck down six legal provisions considered discriminatory towards trans and non-binary Québecois, including one forbidding the use of non-binary gender designations, and another one prohibiting non-citizens to obtain a change of name and sex designation. The Québec government has until the end of 2021 to amend these aforementioned legal provisions, except for the discriminatory citizenship requirement, which the Court declared invalid with immediate effect. The citizenship requirement has been removed in practice by the Directeur on application forms.

In October 2021, Québec Minister of Justice Simon Jolin-Barrette introduced Bill 2, which among other things would partially reverse Québec's policy on birth certificate changes, creating a second category called "gender identity" on the certificate and allowing trans people to only change that while keeping the "sex" category fixed unless said trans people underwent a sex change. Bill 2 was quickly denounced by various civil society groups, and in November 2021, the Office of the Minister of Justice stated in an e-mail to MTLBlog that "[they were confirming] that the requirement for an operation to change the sex designation [would] be removed from the bill."

Saskatchewan
In February 2016, the provincial government changed the Saskatchewan Vital Statistics Act to eliminate gender confirmation surgery as a prerequisite for changing government documents. In May 2018, a judge ruled that the gender marker can be removed from a birth certificate.

Saskatchewan permits the change of sex designation on a Saskatchewan driver’s licence or photo identification card to all residents. However, a provincial change of legal gender remains inaccessible for Saskatchewan residents born outside the province.

Yukon
On April 25, 2017, a bill called Act to Amend the Human Rights Act and the Vital Statistics Act (2017) was introduced to the Second Session of the 34th Legislative Assembly as Bill 5. Its intended purpose was to add "gender identity or expression" to the Human Rights Act, and to allow the recognition of gender without surgery being required under the Vital Statistics Act. On July 1, 2017, it went into effect.

A person may amend the gender designation on their driver’s licence and/or general identification card by presentation of a Change of Gender Designation form.

A territorial change of legal gender remains inaccessible for Yukon residents born outside the territory.

Discrimination protections

Bill C-16 
Bill C-16, which passed in June 2017, added the words "gender identity and expression" in three instances.  These words were added to the Canadian Human Rights Act as prohibited grounds for discrimination, and to the Criminal Code in two sections, the first dealing with hate speech and hate incitement and the second regarding sentencing for hate crimes.

In 2005, NDP MP Bill Siksay introduced a bill in the House of Commons to explicitly add gender identity and expression as prohibited grounds of discrimination in the Canadian Human Rights Act. He reintroduced the bill in 2006. In May 2009, he introduced it again, with additional provisions to add gender identity and expression to the hate crimes provisions of the Criminal Code. In February 2011, it passed third reading in the House of Commons with support from all parties, but was not considered in the Senate before Parliament was dissolved for the 41st Canadian federal election. Two bills—C-276 and C-279—on the subject have been introduced in the 41st Canadian Parliament, by the Liberals and the NDP respectively. The NDP's Bill C-279 passed second reading on June 6, 2012.  However, the bill again died on the Senate order paper when the 2015 federal election was called. In May 2016, An Act to amend the Canadian Human Rights Act and the Criminal Code (C-16) was introduced to the House of Commons of Canada, to add and include "gender identity or expression" in the Canadian Human Rights Act. In June 2017, the Parliament of Canada passed bill C-16 and received royal assent a week later. The law went into effect immediately as Bill C-16.

Enforcement mechanism
The federal government and every province and territory in Canada has enacted human rights acts that prohibit discrimination and harassment on several grounds (e.g. race, gender identity or expression, age, marital status, sexual orientation, disability, sex, religion) in private and public sector employment, housing, public services and publicity. Some acts also apply to additional activities. These acts are quasi-constitutional laws that override ordinary laws as well as regulations, contracts and collective agreements. They are typically enforced by human rights commissions and tribunals through a complaint investigation, conciliation and arbitration process that is slow, but free, and includes protection against retaliation. A lawyer is not required.

Grounds for prohibiting discrimination
In 1977, the Québec Charter of Rights and Freedoms, which is both a charter of rights and a human rights act, was amended to prohibit discrimination based on sexual orientation. Thus, the province of Québec became the first jurisdiction in the world larger than a city or county to prohibit sexual orientation discrimination in the private and public sectors. Today, sexual orientation is explicitly mentioned as a ground of prohibited discrimination in the human rights acts of all jurisdictions in Canada. In 2016, gender identity or expression was added to the Québec Charter.

Sexual orientation is not defined in any human rights act, but is widely interpreted as meaning heterosexuality, homosexuality and bisexuality. It does not include transsexuality or transgender people. The Federal Court of Canada has stated that sexual orientation "is a precise legal concept that deals specifically with an individual's preference in terms of gender" in sexual relationships, and is not vague or overly broad. The Ontario Human Rights Commission has adopted the following definition:
Sexual orientation is more than simply a 'status' that an individual possesses; it is an immutable personal characteristic that forms part of an individual's core identity. Sexual orientation encompasses the range of human sexuality from gay and lesbian to bisexual and heterosexual orientations.

All human rights laws in Canada also explicitly prohibit discrimination based on disability, which has been interpreted to include AIDS, ARC and being HIV positive, and membership in a high-risk group for HIV infection.

Since June 2017, all places within Canada explicitly within the Canadian Human Rights Act, equal opportunity and/or anti-discrimination legislation prohibit discrimination against gender identity or gender identity or expression.

In addition, human rights commissions consider that sex discrimination includes discrimination based on gender identity at the federal level and in New Brunswick.

The Ontario Human Rights Commission defines gender identity as follows:
Gender identity is linked to an individual's intrinsic sense of self and, particularly the sense of being male or female. Gender identity may or may not conform to a person's birth assigned sex. The personal characteristics that are associated with gender identity include self-image, physical and biological appearance, expression, behaviour and conduct, as they relate to gender. … Individuals whose birth-assigned sex does not conform to their gender identity include transsexuals [sic], transgenderists [sic], intersexed [sic] persons and cross-dressers. A person's gender identity is fundamentally different from and not determinative of their sexual orientation.

LGBT discrimination protections table

Activities where equality is guaranteed
Discrimination, including harassment, based on real or perceived sexual orientation, HIV/AIDS and gender identity is prohibited throughout Canada in private and public sector employment, housing and services provided to the public.  All aspects of employment are covered, including benefits for spouses and long-term partners. Examples of services include credit, insurance, government programs and schools open to the public. Schools open to the public are liable for anti-gay name-calling and bullying by students or staff.

Prohibited discrimination occurs not only when someone is treated less favourably or is harassed based on a prohibited ground, but also when a policy or practice has an unintended disproportionately adverse effect based on that ground. This is called "adverse effect discrimination". For example, it might in theory be discriminatory for schools to implement a uniform policy that has specifically gendered uniforms.

Trans inclusion in the Canadian Forces 
LGBT Canadians have been allowed to serve in the military since the Douglas case was settled in 1992. However, in March 2019 The Canadian Armed Forces (CAF) issued revised policies with a mandate of inclusion of gender diverse Canadians. The new directive stresses ones right to freely express their gender identity and outlines uniform and naming protocols, medical and surgical support opportunities and accommodations to privacy.

Trans considerations in federal prison 
In 2018 new operations were implemented to accommodate offenders based on gender identity instead of sex assigned at birth. These policy amendments are a result of The Canadian Human Rights Commission, The Correctional Service of Canada and Prisoners Legal Services combined efforts. They include changes such as using an offenders preferred name and pronouns, placing offenders in a men's or women's institutions based on gender identity regardless of anatomy and ensuring the privacy, dignity and safety of trans or gender-diverse offenders.

Policy numbers and titles that have been amended

CD 352 – Inmate Clothing Entitlements

CD 550 – Inmate Accommodation (and User Guide)

CD 566-7 – Searching of Offenders

CD 566-10 – Urinalysis Testing

CD 566-12 – Personal Property Of Offenders

CD 567-1 – Use of Force

CD 577 – Staff Protocol in Women Offender Institutions

CD 702 – Aboriginal Offenders

CD 705-1 – Preliminary Assessments and Post-Sentence Community Assessments

CD 705-3 – Immediate Needs Identification and Admission Interviews

CD 705-7 – Security Classification and Penitentiary Placement

CD 710-2 – Transfer of Inmates

CD 800 – Health Services

GL 800-5 – Gender Dysphoria

CD 843 – Interventions to Preserve Life and Prevent Serious Bodily Harm

Coverage for transition-related surgeries
Canada's system of universal healthcare is delivered through provincial healthcare systems, which vary in terms of their benefits and features, including in the area of transgender health care. As of 2020, all provinces provided coverage for sex reassignment surgery such as vaginoplasty, orchiectomy, or phalloplasty. New Brunswick was the last province to begin insuring such procedures in 2016. Insurance coverage is not generally provided for the transition-related procedures of facial feminization surgery, tracheal shave, or laser hair removal.
Reproductive services are also not covered for trans people, with the costs being quite high. For example Rainbow Health Ontario, an LGBTQ+ healthcare organization, estimates that freezing sperm typically costs $125 to $300, with an additional $200 for each year of storage. They also estimate that preserving embryos costs between $480 to $650, with $150 to $300 in storage fees.

The first transgender healthcare clinic in Canada opened at the Clarke Institute of Psychiatry in Toronto in 1969. In 1970, Canadian transgender women Dianna Boileau underwent surgery at Toronto General Hospital to have her remaining male genitals removed and female genitals constructed. It was the first time such a surgery had been covered by the Ontario Health Insurance Plan. It was also the first widely publicized sex reassignment surgery in Canada. The first transgender healthcare clinic to offer genital surgery was the Centre Métropolitain de Chirurgie Plastique in Montreal, which opened in 1973. It was also the only Canadian clinic that performed vaginoplasties, the surgical construction of a vagina, on transgender women for 45 years. Transgender surgical clinics opened at Women's College Hospital in Toronto in 2017, and at Vancouver General Hospital in 2019.

Ontario
The Ontario Health Insurance Plan (OHIP) began covering sex reassignment surgery in 1970. The first person to have such a surgery under OHIP was Dianna Boileau. It was removed from the list of covered procedures in October 1998 under Mike Harris' Progressive Conservative government, apparently as a cost-saving measure, sparking an outcry from the transgender community. Some surgeries began to be covered again in 2008.

Until 2016, only a single clinic, the Gender Identity Clinic at the Centre for Addiction and Mental Health in Toronto, was able to provide referrals for OHIP-reimbursed surgeries. Ontario saw a large rise in patients seeking SRS after 2008, and by 2015, the CAMH gender clinic had a waitlist of 1,150. That year, Ontario health minister Eric Hoskins announced plans to allow referrals from any qualified healthcare provider. The changes went into effect in 2016.

Newfoundland and Labrador 
Similar to Ontario, Newfoundland and Labrador's Medical Care Plan (MCP) formerly required surgical assessments from CAMH as a prerequisite for covering SRS procedures. This was subject to outcry from the province's trans community, including in one case a complaint filed with the Newfoundland Human Rights Commission. It was the last province to require such an assessment.

In 2019, a new policy on Transition-Related Surgeries went into effect, removing the CAMH assessment requirement. However, other barriers still exist for Newfoundlanders and Labradoreans accessing SRS procedures; some procedures are not covered at all, and since all surgeries are performed outside the province, costs relating to travel and accommodations must be paid upfront. MTAP (the Medical Transportation Assistance Program) does provide some subsidies for these non-surgical costs, but only partially.

Yukon 
On March 12, 2021, the Yukon government made changes to Transition-Related Surgeries policy that would by April provide a nationally unmatched coverage - e.g. for facial feminization surgery and voice training, which are not usually covered by provincial/territorial medical care plans. The government also stated its intent to align with best practices identified by World Professional Association for Transgender Health (WPATH) guidelines.

Blood donation
On August 15, 2016, Canadian Blood Services' new eligibility criteria for transgender people came into effect. This criteria states that transgender donors who have not had lower gender affirming surgery will be asked questions based on their sex assigned at birth. They will be eligible to donate or be deferred based on these criteria. For example, trans women will be asked if they have had sex with a man in the last 12 months. If the response is yes, they will be deferred for one year after their last sexual contact with a man. Donors who have had lower gender affirming surgery will be deferred from donating blood for one year after their surgery. After that year, these donors will be screened in their affirmed gender. This means that trans women who have not had gender affirming surgery and have sex with men will be deferred for three months following last sexual contact before being eligible, similarly to men who have sex with men.

This distinction between operative and non-operative trans women has been deemed as transphobic by some trans rights activists in different provinces.

Conversion therapy 

Since 2022, conversion therapy (including attempting to 'convert' transgender individuals to cisgender) has been illegal in all provinces and territories. The provinces of Ontario, Manitoba, Quebec, Nova Scotia, and Prince Edward Island had bans in place prior to the enactment of federal legislation. In 2018, the City of Vancouver became the only city in British Columbia to outlaw the practice, and in 2019 St. Albert became the first City in Alberta to ban the practice followed by Edmonton also in 2019, and Calgary in 2020. And on 9 March 2020, the Minister of Justice introduced Bill C-8, An Act to amend the Criminal Code (conversion therapy). Due to a prorogue of parliament by Prime Minister Justin Trudeau, the bill died and was later revived in 2020 as Bill C-6, and was passed in the House of Commons with some opposition from Conservative MPs.

Ontario 
In 2015, Ontario premier Kathleen Wynne directed her Health Minister, Eric Hoskins, to petition the College of Physicians and Surgeons of Ontario for a ban on conversion therapy under their standards of practice. As well, Wynne spoke in favour of a bill tabled by Cheri DiNovo, a member of the provincial New Democratic Party, that would outlaw any attempt to change the gender or sexuality of a person under 18 via therapy. The bill passed unanimously in the Legislative Assembly of Ontario. Wynne, as the first openly gay Premier in Canada, stated that youths expressing their sexuality and gender identity should be protected, and that young LGBTQ people are especially vulnerable to these conversion therapy practices.

Manitoba 
Also in 2015, Manitoban Health Minister Sharon Blady announced plans for the province to ban the practice of conversion therapy, and stated that conversion therapy had "no place" in Manitoba's healthcare system. This ban targeted the conversion of homosexual people to heterosexual, and had no specific provisions for transgender individuals being "converted" to cisgender.

Nova Scotia 
A bill banning conversion therapy for sexual orientation and gender identity was passed unanimously in the House of Assembly of Nova Scotia in 2018. The bill, lauded by Nova Scotian Justice Minister Mark Furey as the "most progressive piece of legislation around sexual orientation and gender identity in the country", bans the promotion of such practices to persons under 19, but contains a very controversial clause allowing "mature minors" between the ages of 16 and 18 to consent to being subject to the practice.

British Columbia 
Members of the Legislative Assembly of British Columbia tabled legislation to ban the practice of conversion therapy in 2019 and again in 2020, although neither private member's bill progressed passed first reading. In August 2019, the B.C. government called on the federal government to add conversion therapy into the Criminal Code of Canada and take action banning the practice nationwide.

Vancouver 
Vancouver became the first jurisdiction in British Columbia to ban the practice for gender identity and sexual orientation in 2018. This ban, added to Vancouver's business prohibition bylaw, prohibits the offering of these services to people of any age and was passed unanimously by the Vancouver City Council.

Alberta

Edmonton 
The city of Edmonton unanimously passed bylaw 19061, prohibiting conversion therapy within the city.

St. Albert 
Though conversion therapy has not been known to happen in St. Albert, the city council unanimously passed a motion to ban it as a statement against the practice.

See also

 Transgender rights
 Name change
 List of transgender-related topics
 LGBT rights in Canada
 Intersex rights in Canada

References

Canada
Transgender in Canada
LGBT rights in Canada